Edenhope is a town in Victoria, Australia. It is located on the Wimmera Highway, 30 kilometres from the South Australian border, in the Shire of West Wimmera local government area. At the  Edenhope had a population of 946.

The township of Edenhope was established some years later than nearby Apsley, the Post Office opening on 16 July 1864.

Naming of town

The first European settlers in the district were the Hope family, in 1845. They came from Scotland and had lived next to the Eden River.
The Hope family established the Lake Wallace pastoral station.

Lake Wallace

Edenhope sits on the southern shore of Lake Wallace, which covers an area of around 200 hectares. The lake is a five minute walk from Edenhope's main street. There is a jetty and several boat ramps. Lake Wallace is also a waterbird haven where black swans nest in spring. There are bird hides and a 5 km scenic walking track around the lake.

Lake Wallace dries up at times of extreme drought but is now filling again after the return of better seasons. The waterbird population is slowly increasing. On Lake Street in the grounds of the Secondary College, there is a cairn commemorating the first all-Aboriginal cricket team to go to England.

Historical buildings

The Edenhope Magistrates' Court closed on 1 January 1983. Opposite the Court House is the Back Swamp, home to local bird life which can be viewed from the bird hide and bird walk.

Accommodation
Accommodation at Edenhope includes the Edenhope Motor Inn & Restaurant and the Lake Wallace Hotel.

Recreation
Edenhope has a horse racing club, the Edenhope Racing Club, which holds the Edenhope Cup meeting on the Labour Day weekend in March. The Apsley Racing Club also hold their Cup meeting there in April.

Golfers play at the Edenhope Golf Club on Laidlaw Avenue. 

The Edenhope-Apsley Football Netball Club was created from a merger with the team from nearby Apsley in 1999. The team competes in the Horsham & District Football League, after competing in the Kowree-Naracoorte-Tatiara Football League until 2006. Previously Edenhope and Aspley had a healthy rivalry that developed in the Kowree-Naracoorte Football League.
 
Edenhope hosts Henley on Lake Wallace on the second Saturday in February. The regatta and related events date back to 1921, when funds were raised to erect a memorial to soldiers of the First World War.

Notable people
 Don Dixon a former  footballer
 Graeme MacKenzie a former  footballer
 Max Galpin a former  footballer
 Bruce Greenhill a former  footballer
 Richard Charles Guthridge, early settler
 Tom McDonald a current  footballer 
 Oscar McDonald a current  footballer 
 Alex Forster a former player at the Fremantle Football Club

References

Towns in Victoria (Australia)
Wimmera
Fishing communities in Australia